Paltan is a 2018 Indian Hindi-language action-war film written, directed and produced by J. P. Dutta, based on 1967 Nathu La and Cho La clashes along the Sikkim border after 1962 Sino-Indian War. It stars an ensemble cast with Jackie Shroff, Arjun Rampal, Sonu Sood, Harshvardhan Rane, Sonal Chauhan, Dipika Kakar and many more. The film was theatrically released on 7 September 2018.

Plot 

The film is Based on clashes between Indian and Chinese troops in the regions of Nathu La and Cho La in 1967 where Indian troops defeated Chinese troops and stopped their attempts to encroach on Indian territory.

An Indian platoon is deployed near China. After some days Chinese troops starts creating trouble by using loud speakers and by threatening Indian troops by going near the border. Indian troops does the same to quite the Chinese troops. One day Chinese and Indian troops engage in stone clashes and After that Indian troops start building the fence at border but it was later destroyed by Chinese army. 

Indian army tries to build border again but met with heavy fire by chinese. Indian troops returned fire but were facing trouble by Chinese artillery. Indian commander asked troops to hold their Positions till the Indian artillery arrives to support them. Both Side faces Casualties and Indian artillery arrives resulting in Heavy Chinese Casualties. 

Indian troops won and were able to rain down heavy artillery firing on Chinese bunkers.

Cast
 Jackie Shroff as Maj. General Sagat Singh, General Officer Commanding (GOC) 17 Mountain Division
 Arjun Rampal as Lt. Col. Rai Singh Yadav, CO , 2 Grenadiers
 Sonu Sood as Maj. Bishen Singh, 2IC, 2 Grenadiers
 Harshvardhan Rane as Maj. Harbhajan Singh, 18 Rajput Regiment now  (13 Mechanised Infantry)
 Gurmeet Choudhary as Capt. Prithvi Singh Dagar, 2 Grenadiers
 Siddhanth Kapoor as Hawaldar Parashar, Intelligence Corps
 Luv Sinha as Second Lieutenant Attar Singh, 2 Grenadiers
 Rohit Roy as Maj. Cheema, Corps of Engineers
 Abhilash Chaudhary as Hawaldar Lakshmi Chand Yadav, 2 Grenadiers
 Nagender Choudhary as Nb.Sub. Raghav Prasad Pandey, 18 Rajput Regiment now  (13 Mechanised Infantry)
 Esha Gupta in a special appearance as Lt. Col. Rai Singh Yadav’s wife
 Sonal Chauhan as Maj. Bishen Singh's wife
 Monica Gill as Harjot Kaur, Maj. Harbhajan Singh's girlfriend
 Dipika Kakar as Capt. Prithvi Singh Dagar's fiancee

Soundtrack  

The background score of the film is composed by Sanjoy Chowdhury and songs are composed by Anu Malik. The lyrics are written by Javed Akhtar. The first song "Paltan Title Track" was released on 13 August 2018. The second song "Raat Kitni" was released on 21 August 2018.
The music in the Paltan song is borrowed from the theme music of iconic 1957 Hollywood blockbuster The Bridge on the River Kwai.

Reception 
The film received very good reviews from the families of the soldiers who participated in the war who thanked J P Dutta, the film producer for presenting the life story of the unsung army officers.

The movie also received very good reviews from army circles and officials from the Defence Ministry of India for revealing the true incidents from the lesser known battle of 1967 war at the Sikkim border.

Audience and critics found the film's execution largely ineffective for a war film with caricature characters and an extremely long runtime. Ronak Kotecha of The Times of India gave it 3/5 stars calling it a long-drawn war-drama that picks up only during the final moments.

References

External links
  
 

Indian war drama films
War films based on actual events
Sino-Indian War films
Indian Army in films
2010s action war films
Films scored by Anu Malik
2018 films
2010s Hindi-language films
2018 war drama films
2018 action drama films
Indian action drama films
Films directed by J. P. Dutta
Indian action war films